Agnarr is the brother of Gerriod, son of Hraudung in Norse mythology. Agnarr is solely attested in the poem Grímnismál in the Poetic Edda, the latter compiled in the 13th century from earlier traditional sources. In Grímnismál he is described as aiding Odin, disguised as Grímnir, to escape from Geirröðr's torture.

Notes

References 
 Orchard, Andy (1997). Dictionary of Norse Myth and Legend. Cassell. 
 Simek, Rudolf (2007) translated by Angela Hall. Dictionary of Northern Mythology. D.S. Brewer. 

People in Norse mythology
Odin